Calosoma viridissimum is a species of ground beetle in the subfamily of Carabinae. It was described by Haury in 1880.

References

viridissimum
Beetles described in 1880